Wauchope (pronounced "walk-up") is an unincorporated community in the southeast corner of the Canadian province of Saskatchewan.  It is located between the towns of Manor and Redvers, and is situated on the Saskatchewan Highway 13.  Once a thriving French language settlement in the early 20th century, the town used to have a Catholic Residential School (1917–64), a saloon, a general store, a motor repair shop, and other businesses. The town is in the rural municipality of Antler No. 61.

Today the community is home to approximately five families.  Still standing is the Catholic Church and rectory, with a large Catholic cemetery located beside the church.  Regular church services are no longer offered but the community maintains the church and it is used for special occasions.  A local baseball diamond is also maintained.  Also present is a working grain elevator.

It is believed that most of the town residents dispersed after the local well went dry but this has yet to be confirmed. Wauchope is now a semi-ghost town.

See also

 List of communities in Saskatchewan
 Block settlement

References

Antler No. 61, Saskatchewan
Former villages in Saskatchewan
Unincorporated communities in Saskatchewan